The 1951 National Invitation Tournament was the fourteenth edition of the annual NCAA college basketball competition.
Held in New York City at Madison Square Garden, its championship was on Saturday, March 17, and BYU defeated Dayton by nineteen 

The following week, BYU participated in the 16-team NCAA tournament, and lost in the quarterfinal round, by ten points to

Selected teams
Twelve teams selected for the tournament.

 Arizona
 Beloit
 BYU
 Cincinnati
 Dayton
 La Salle
 Lawrence Tech
 NC State
 St. Bonaventure
 St. John's
 Saint Louis
 Seton Hall

Bracket
Below is the tournament bracket.

See also
 1951 NCAA basketball tournament
 1951 NAIA Division I men's basketball tournament

References

National Invitation
National Invitation Tournament
1950s in Manhattan
Basketball in New York City
College sports in New York City
Madison Square Garden
National Invitation Tournament
National Invitation Tournament
Sports competitions in New York City
Sports in Manhattan